Frank Rocholl is a German graphic designer, art director and typeface designer. He is also creative director and co-editor of the international fashion publication Mirage Magazine.

Biography
Rocholl started his career as a designer in the early 1990s, when he established the design agency Landscape in Düsseldorf. From 1996 to 1997 he worked as a creative director for the design agency Meiré und Meiré.

Rocholls work has been featured in international publications about typography, logo design and graphic design.

In 2003 he presented his first font family, called Nuri, which is distributed by FontShop International.

In 2008 Rocholl and Henrik Purienne, a fashion photographer and film director from Cape Town, South Africa, established Mirage – a fashion magazine inspired by the photographic aesthetic and hedonistic culture of the 1960s and 1970s. The design language of Mirage Magazine developed by Rocholl has been presented in various print and online publications.

In 2010 Rocholl was commissioned executive Art Director for the German car culture magazine Ramp and Gapz, a travel culture magazine from the same publishing group.

In June 2013 Rocholl was responsible for the 1960s influenced Graphic Design of the Glam Rock exhibition at the Schirn Kunsthalle.

Since November 2013 Rocholl has been represented by Schierke Artists.

In February 2014 Rocholl will speak at the Quo Vadis Editorial Design Conference Munich, along with Harry Peccinotti, Mario Lombardo, Mirko Borsche, Wilhelm Vosskuhl and Rolf Müller.

Awards
 2011 – Mercury Editorial Design Award. Category: Gold Award for Gapz Magazine
 2006 – If Award. Category: Communication Design for the German State of Hessen
 2002 – IdN (International Design Network Magazine) Decade Design Award. Best Graphic Design for client I-TV-T AG

Publications

Book contributions
 Turning Pages, Editorial Design for printed Media (Robert Klanten, Sven Ehmann, Kitty Bolhöfer, Floyd Schulze) Die Gestalten, Berlin, 2010,  Editorial Design for Mirage Magazine
 Los Logos 4 (Robert Klanten, Hendrik Heilige, Adeline Mollard, Hans Baltzer), Die Gestalten, Berlin, 2008,  Logos contributed by Rocholl
 Tres Logos (Robert Klanten, Nicolas Bourquin, Thorsten Geiger), Die Gestalten, Berlin, 2006,  Logos contributed by Rocholl
 Layout Workbook (Kristin Cullen), Rockport Publishers, Gloucester, 2005,  Case Studies about Möller Design Folder, Area Fashion Magazine, KearneyRocholl Folder and Nuri Promotional Poster. 
 1000 Type Treatments (WilsonHarvey/Loewy), Rockport Publishers, Gloucester, 2005,  Logos contributed by Rocholl
 The complete Typographer (Will Hill), New Media Typography, Quarto Publishing London 2005,  Case study about Rocholl Website as an example for new media typography.
 Type One (Robert Klanten, Micha Mischler, Silja Bilz, Nik Thoenen), Type Essay, Die Gestalten, Berlin, 2004, . 2-page essay about Font Design by Rocholl, Case Study about the Nuri Font.
 Typograph Workbook (Timothy Samara), Rockport Publishers, Gloucester, 2004  Case Studies about Rocholl website and Packard brand relaunch
 Idn Decade Design Awards.01.02: Kaleidoscopic Age(Systems Design Ltd), 2002  Award presentation I-Tv-T Folder

Magazine contributions
 KearneyRocholl, Novum, the world of graphic design, New Media Magazine Publishing, Munich, 06/2005, 5-page case study about Rocholl Type and Logo Design by Herbert Lechner
 Remixed compilations, PAGE, Magazine for digital design and mediaproduction, Macup Publishing, Hamburg, 04/2005, 3-page essay by Rocholl about the artist Tom Sachs
 Leihgaben, PAGE, Magazine for digital design and mediaproduction, Macup Publishing, Hamburg, 12/2004, 1-page case study about KearneyRocholl Broschure Design
 Nu kid in town, PAGE, Magazine for digital design and mediaproduction, Macup Publishing, Hamburg, 09/2003, 4-page Case Study about the Nuri Typeface by Antje Dohmann
 Helvetica returns, PAGE, Magazine for digital design and mediaproduction, Macup Publishing, Hamburg, 11/2001, 1-page essay by Rocholl for the Type Directors Club
 Identity work, Novum, the world of graphic design, New Media Magazine Publishing, Munich, 01/2001, 6-page case study about Rocholl Logo and Broschure Design by Herbert Lechner.

Sources
 Mirage Facebook 
 5 questions to Frank Rocholl 
 Itsnicethat, Review 
 Highsnobiety Review 
 GoSee Mirage Info 
 Nowearland

References

German graphic designers
Living people
Year of birth missing (living people)